Alberta Provincial Highway No. 88, commonly referred to as Highway 88 and officially named the Bicentennial Highway, is a north–south highway in Northern Alberta.

History 
Highway 88 was originally numbered as Highway 67. It was renumbered to Highway 88 and labeled as Bicentennial Highway in 1988 in celebration of 200 years history of Fort Vermilion – one of two communities that claim to be the first European settlement in Alberta (the other being Fort Chipewyan on Lake Athabasca to the east).

Major intersections 
From south to north:

References 

088